Stade Général Eyadema is a multi-use stadium in Lomé, Togo.  It is currently used mostly for football matches.  The stadium holds 15,000 people, and it was opened in 1968.

Football venues in Togo
Stade General Eyadema
Sports venues completed in 1968